The Buttinière tram stop is located on line  of the tramway de Bordeaux.

Situation
The station is located on the border of Cenon and Lormont. There is a large carpark and a bus interchange located at Buttinière.

Close by

Palmer Park
Carrefour

See also
 TBC
 Tramway de Bordeaux

External links
 

Bordeaux tramway stops
Tram stops in Cenon
Railway stations in France opened in 2003